Alessio Dionisi (born 1 April 1980) is an Italian professional football coach and former player who is the head coach of  club Sassuolo.

Playing career
A centre back with free kick abilities, Dionisi spent most of his career at Serie C2 and Serie D level, with his personal highlight being at Tritium, a club he captained and with whom he won promotion to Lega Pro Prima Divisione and also played in the Italian third tier for a season.

Coaching career
Dionisi retired from active playing footballing in 2014, immediately being named head coach of Serie D club Olginatese, which was his final club as a player. He then managed again at Serie D level with Borgosesia from 2015 to 2017, and Fiorenzuola in the 2017–18 season.

He was then named head coach of Serie D club Imolese in 2018, guiding the club to second place in the league. After the club was admitted to Serie C to fill a vacancy, he was confirmed at Imolese, and successfully guided the small club from Emilia-Romagna to a historic third place in the league (the best result in the club's history) and a place in the promotion playoffs, where his club was defeated by Piacenza in the semi-finals.

His impressive results with Imolese won him the attentions of Venezia, who appointed him as head coach on 3 July 2019. With Venezia readmitted to Serie B in place of Palermo, he guided the Venetians to keep their place in the Italian second division.

On 19 August 2020, he was announced as the new head coach of Serie B club Empoli. On his first season in charge, he led Empoli to become 2020–21 Serie B champions and ensure themselves promotion to Serie A. His impressive results at Empoli led to Serie A club Sassuolo offering him the vacant role of head coach after Roberto De Zerbi's departure; after rescinding his contract with Empoli on 15 June 2021, Dionisi signed a two-year deal with Sassuolo the following day, effective from 1 July 2021.

Career statistics

Managerial

Honours

Head coach
Empoli
 Serie B: 2020–21

References

1980 births
Living people
Sportspeople from the Province of Siena
Footballers from Tuscany
Italian footballers
Association football central defenders
A.C.N. Siena 1904 players
A.S.D. AVC Vogherese 1919 players
S.S.D. Varese Calcio players
Tritium Calcio 1908 players
A.S.D. Calcio Ivrea players
A.C. Sambonifacese players
S.S. Verbania Calcio players
U.S.D. Olginatese players
Serie D players
Serie C players
Italian football managers
U.S.D. Olginatese managers
Borgosesia Calcio managers
U.S. Fiorenzuola 1922 S.S. managers
Imolese Calcio 1919 managers
Venezia F.C. managers
Empoli F.C. managers
U.S. Sassuolo Calcio managers
Serie D managers
Serie C managers
Serie B managers
Serie A managers